James Dunn (born November 12, 2000) is a Canadian sledge hockey player. As the youngest member of Canada's national para ice hockey team at the 2018 Winter Paralympics, he won a silver medal. At the 2022 Winter Paralympics, he won a silver medal in Para ice hockey.

Early life
Dunn was born on November 12, 2000, in Wallacetown, Ontario, Canada to parents Jeremy and Coralee Dunn. On December 2, 2011, at the age of 11, he had had a biopsy taken on his right femur bone and was diagnosed with osteosarcoma. He immediately underwent chemotherapy treatments and had his leg amputated in a surgical procedure that lasted almost 16 hours. While recovering in the hospital, Dunn was encouraged by Tyler McGregor to try out sledge hockey.

Career
On February 11, 2018, at the age of 17, Dunn became the youngest member named to Canada's national para ice hockey team to compete at the 2018 Winter Paralympics. With his assistance, Team Canada won a silver medal in an overtime loss to the United States.

References

External links 
 
 

2000 births
Living people
Canadian sledge hockey players
Paralympic sledge hockey players of Canada
Paralympic silver medalists for Canada
Para ice hockey players at the 2018 Winter Paralympics
Para ice hockey players at the 2022 Winter Paralympics
Medalists at the 2018 Winter Paralympics
Medalists at the 2022 Winter Paralympics
Paralympic medalists in sledge hockey